Churchill Park is a multi-purpose stadium in Lautoka, Fiji.  It is currently used mostly for football matches and hosts the home matches of Lautoka F.C. The Stadium also hosts International Rugby matches such as the Pacific Nations Cup and the Pacific Rugby Cup as well as local rugby competitions such as the Colonial Cup and the Sanyo Cup.  The stadium held 18,000 people but in 2016, they added athletic tracks and tore down the other side of the Stadium thus reducing capacity to less than 10,000.

References

Football venues in Fiji
Rugby league stadiums in Fiji
Rugby union stadiums in Fiji
Multi-purpose stadiums in Fiji